Pollanisus subdolosa is a moth of the family Zygaenidae. It is found in Australia in Victoria and from south-eastern Queensland to New South Wales.

The length of the forewings is 7.5–10.5 mm for males and 7–8 mm for females. There are two generations per year.

The larvae feed on Hibbertia scandens.

Subspecies
Pollanisus subdolosa subdolosa Walker, 1865 (Victoria)
Pollanisus subdolosa clara Tarmann, 2005 (south-eastern Queensland to New South Wales)

External links
Australian Faunal Directory
Zygaenid moths of Australia: a revision of the Australian Zygaenidae

Moths of Australia
subdolosa
Moths described in 1865